The Yugoslav order of battle before the invasion of Yugoslavia includes a listing (or order of battle) of all operational formations of the Royal Yugoslav Army (VKJ), Royal Yugoslav Army Air Force (VVKJ) and Royal Yugoslav Navy (KJRM) immediately prior to the World War II invasion of that country in April 1941.

The VKJ consisted of 33 divisions and a significant number of smaller formations, but due to tentative and incomplete mobilisation, only seven divisions and four smaller formations are known to have been at close to fighting strength and in their planned deployment locations when the German-led Axis assault commenced on 6 April 1941. The Yugoslav defence plan involved placing the bulk of its land forces close to its borders, with very limited strategic reserves in depth. Almost all of the divisions that had been effectively mobilised were concentrated in the 3rd Army Group deployed in the east of the country along the Romanian and Bulgarian borders between the Iron Gates and the Greek border. Most of the heavy weapons and armoured vehicles available to the VKJ were obsolete, most formations were heavily reliant on animal-powered transport, and the VKJ had only 50 tanks that could engage front line German tanks on an equal basis.

By 6 April 1941, the VVKJ had been almost completely mobilised, and consisted of four air brigades with more than 423 aircraft of Yugoslav, German, Italian, French, Czech and British design, including 107 modern fighter aircraft, and 100 modern medium bombers. Other than a small number of locally made Rogožarski IK-3 fighters, almost all the modern aircraft available to the VVKJ were of German, Italian or British design for which limited spares and munitions were available.

The KJRM consisted of a flotilla of river monitors based on the Danube and a small fleet based in several ports along the Adriatic coast. The blue-water navy centred on a flotilla leader, three smaller destroyers, four obsolescent submarines and a gunboat, supplemented by minelayers and torpedo boats. Some of the smaller vessels in the Yugoslav fleet had been inherited from the defeated Austro-Hungarian Empire following World War I and were obsolete.

Royal Yugoslav Army

At the time of the invasion, the Royal Yugoslav Army (VKJ) consisted of 29 infantry divisions, three horse cavalry divisions, and a divisional-sized mountain detachment. There were also a significant number of independent infantry, cavalry, mountain, and combined arms brigades, infantry and cavalry regiments and fortress troops, as well as 17 border guard battalions. The Commander-in-chief of the VKJ was the 17-year-old King Peter II, and the Chief of the General Staff was the Prime Minister, Armijski đeneral Dušan Simović. The Yugoslav defence plan positioned almost all land forces close to its borders, with very limited strategic reserves in depth. The VKJ was heavily reliant on animal-powered transport, mainly oxen, and had only 50 relatively modern Renault R35 tanks that could fight German tanks on an equal footing, although these were only just being formed into a unit at the time of the invasion. The VKJ was organised into the 1st, 2nd and 3rd Army Groups, the independent 5th and 6th Armies and the Coastal Defence Command. The General Headquarters of the VKJ maintained command over five infantry divisions and a large number of smaller infantry, engineer and artillery units, as well as the only operational tank battalion. Each Army Group and independent Army was supported by an air reconnaissance group attached from the Royal Yugoslav Army Air Force  (VVKJ). As mobilisation had been tentative and partial, many divisions were still in the process of mobilisation on 6 April 1941. The VKJ order of battle on 6 April 1941 is detailed below as provided by Niehorster.

1st Army Group

The 1st Army Group was commanded by Armijski đeneral Milorad Petrović. It consisted of the 4th Army of Armijski đeneral Petar Nedeljković, responsible for the Yugoslav-Hungarian border and deployed behind the Drava between Varaždin and Slatina, and the 7th Army of Divizijski đeneral (Major General) Dušan Trifunović, which was responsible for the defence of the northwestern border with Italy and the Third Reich.

4th Army support units included one motorised heavy artillery regiment, one artillery regiment, a motorised anti-aircraft battalion, six border guard battalions, and the 4th Air Reconnaissance Group comprising eighteen Breguet 19s was attached from the VVKJ and was based at Velika Gorica just south of Zagreb. The 7th Army was supported by one artillery regiment and the 6th Air Reconnaissance Group consisting of sixteen Breguet 19s based at Brežice, northwest of Zagreb.

2nd Army Group

The 2nd Army Group was commanded by Armijski đeneral Milutin Nedić, and consisted of Armijski đeneral Milan Rađenković's 1st Army, responsible for the area between the Danube and the Tisza, and the 2nd Army of Armijski đeneral Dragoslav Miljković, responsible for the border from Slatina to the Danube. There was no Army Group reserve, but the 2nd Army was to constitute a reserve consisting of the 10th Infantry Division Bosanska deployed south of Brod.

The 1st Army was supported by one artillery regiment, one anti-aircraft battalion, and the 1st Air Reconnaissance Group consisting of fifteen Breguet 19s based at Ruma, just west of Sremska Mitrovica. 2nd Army support units comprised one artillery regiment, one anti-aircraft battalion, one border guard battalion, and the 3rd Air Reconnaissance Group consisting of sixteen Breguet 19s based at Staro Topolje just east of Brod.

3rd Army Group

The 3rd Army Group was commanded by Armijski đeneral Milan Nedić. It consisted of Armijski đeneral Ilija Brašić's 3rd Army, responsible for the border with Albania between Lake Ohrid to Lake Skadar, and the 3rd Territorial Army of Armijski đeneral Jovan Naumović, which was responsible for the eastern sector of the Greek border and a sector along the Bulgarian border.  The Army Group reserve consisted of the 22nd Infantry Division Ibarska, deployed around Skopje.

3rd Army support units included one artillery regiment, one anti-aircraft battalion, eight border guard battalions, and the 5th Air Reconnaissance Group consisting of fourteen Breguet 19s based at Tetovo west of Skopje. The 3rd Territorial Army was supported by one motorised heavy artillery regiment.

5th Independent Army

The 5th Independent Army was commanded by Armijski đeneral Vladimir Cukavac, and had responsibility for the Romanian and Bulgarian borders between the Iron Gates and the Greek border.

The support units of the 5th Independent Army were two motorised heavy artillery regiments, an anti-aircraft battalion, two border guard battalions, and the 2nd Air Reconnaissance Group consisting of sixteen Breguet 19s based at Šarlince south of Niš.

6th Independent Army

The 6th Independent Army was commanded by Armijski đeneral Dimitrije Živković, and was originally intended to form the strategic reserve for the VKJ. It was deployed around Belgrade and in the Banat region east of the Tisza. It held two infantry divisions in reserve in the lower Morava valley.

The 6th Independent Army was supported by an anti-aircraft battalion and the 7th Air Reconnaissance Group consisting of eighteen Breguet 19s based at Smederevska Palanka.

Coastal Defence Command
Coastal Defence Command was commanded by Armijski đeneral Živko Stanisaviljević, and was responsible for the defence of the Adriatic coast from the Bay of Kotor to Gospić.

Coastal Defence Command was supported by a heavy artillery regiment and an anti-aircraft battalion, and a coastal reconnaissance squadron of four aircraft based near Mostar.

General Headquarters Direct Command
General Headquarters of the VKJ maintained direct command of five infantry divisions, four independent infantry regiments, two motorised engineer regiments and one tank battalion. A further tank battalion was being formed at the time of the invasion. It also had at its disposal two motorised heavy artillery regiments, fifteen artillery battalions, two anti-aircraft battalions and five independent anti-aircraft companies.

Major equipment

In April 1941, a significant amount of obsolete equipment was in service with the VKJ, much of which was of World War I vintage. For example, of the 7,000 artillery pieces, less than 60 per cent were relatively modern, and only 50 of the tanks on hand were of comparable quality to front line German tanks. The army inventory included the following major items of equipment:

Royal Yugoslav Army Air Force

By April 1941, due to the difficulties Yugoslavia had faced in sourcing aircraft, the Royal Yugoslav Army Air Force (VVKJ) was equipped with 11 different types of operational aircraft, 14 types of training aircraft, and five types of auxiliary aircraft. These aircraft used 22 different engines, four different machine guns and two models of aircraft cannon. This made the training, supply and maintenance of the VVKJ quite problematic. The VVKJ was organised into a headquarters, four air brigades and one naval brigade. Its order of battle on 6 April 1941 is detailed below as provided by Shores, Cull and Malizia, the most detailed work available on the subject.

Air Force Headquarters
The VVKJ was commanded by Brigadni General (Brigadier) Borivoje Mirković, from his headquarters at Lješnica, and had two air groups and one independent squadron under its direct command. Niehorster includes the VVKJ transport group and the air training school as under the direct command of Army Air Force Headquarters, and they have been shown here for completeness.

1st Fighter Brigade
The 1st Fighter Brigade was commanded by Pukovnik (Colonel) Dragutin Rupčić, whose headquarters was at Zemun. It consisted of the 2nd and 6th Fighter Regiments and a liaison squadron.

2nd Mixed Air Brigade
The 2nd Mixed Air Brigade was commanded by Pukovnik Jakov Đorđević, whose headquarters was at Nova Topola. It consisted of the 4th Fighter Regiment, the 8th Bomber Regiment, and a liaison squadron.

3rd Mixed Air Brigade
The 3rd Mixed Air Brigade was commanded by Pukovnik Nikola Obuljen, whose headquarters was at Stubol. It consisted of the 3rd Bomber Regiment, 5th Fighter Regiment, and a liaison squadron.

4th Bomber Brigade
The 4th Bomber Brigade was commanded by Pukovnik Petar Vukčević, whose headquarters was at Ljubić. It consisted of the 1st and 7th Bomber Regiments and a liaison squadron.

Aircraft types
The Royal Yugoslav Army Air Force inventory in April 1941 included more than 423 aircraft of Yugoslav, German, Italian, French, Czech and British design, in addition to 20 largely civilian transport aircraft which had been pressed into military service. Of these, 107 of the fighter aircraft were of modern design, the remainder were not capable of meeting front line Axis aircraft on close to equal terms, and were therefore considered obsolete. Some bomber and reconnaissance aircraft were also considered obsolete for the same reason.

Between 6 and 17 April 1941, the VVKJ took receipt of additional aircraft, including eight Hawker Hurricane Mk Is, six Dornier Do 17Ks, four Bristol Blenheim Mk Is, two Icarus IK-2s, one Messerschmitt Bf 109E-3 and one Rogožarski IK-3.

Royal Yugoslav Navy

The Royal Yugoslav Navy (KJRM) was small, with its largest ships being an obsolete former German light cruiser (used as a gunnery training ship), one flotilla leader, and three smaller Beograd-class destroyers. The Chief of the Naval Staff was Rear-Admiral M.L. Polić, and the personnel of the KJRM comprised about 611 officers and 8,562 men. The KJRM was organised into Riverine and Lake Forces, the Maritime Air Force, Naval Coastal Command, three torpedo divisions, the Submarine Division, and a grouping of miscellaneous and training vessels.

Riverine and Lake Forces
The Riverine and Lake Forces of the KJRM were headquartered on the Danube river in Novi Sad, and were organised into the River Flotilla and three Lake Detachments. Each division of the River Flotilla except the Monitor Division included one or more mobilised customs motorboats.

The Lake Ohrid Detachment was based at Ohrid and consisted of two river gunboats, Graničar and Stražar, and one or more mobilised customs motorboats. The Lake Prespa Detachment was based at Asamati, and it is unclear where the Lake Skadar Detachment was based. Both of the latter detachments consisted of one or more mobilised customs motorboats.

Maritime Air Force
The Maritime Air Force was headquartered at Kaštel Lukšić near Split, and consisted of three Hydroplane Commands each of regimental strength.

Naval Coastal Command
The Naval Coastal Command of the KJRM was organised into three sectors along the Adriatic coast of Yugoslavia.

Torpedo Divisions
The 1st Torpedo Division consisted of the flotilla leader Dubrovnik and two of the three Beograd-class destroyers, and was based at Kotor. The remaining Beograd-class destroyer, Ljubljana, was under repair at Šibenik at the time of the invasion. The 2nd and 3rd Torpedo Division consisted of torpedo boats, and were both based at Šibenik.

Submarine Division
The Submarine Division was based in Kotor, and consisted of the submarine tender Hvar and four ageing submarines of British or French manufacture.

Miscellaneous vessels
The KJRM included several miscellaneous vessels that were not allocated to a particular division. They included the gunnery training ship Dalmacija, the gunboat Beli Orao and the converted seaplane tender/minelayer Zmaj.

See also
 Hawker Hurricane in Yugoslav service
 List of ships of the Royal Yugoslav Navy

Notes

Footnotes

References

Books and journals

Papers

Websites

 
 
 
 
 
 
 
 
 
 
 
 
 
 
 
 
 
 
 
 
 
 
 
 
 
 

World War II orders of battle
Balkans campaign (World War II)
Military of the Kingdom of Yugoslavia